Pattu or Pattoo can refer to:
 Traditional name of silk in South India in Tamil and Telugu languages
 A common family name in the Kashmiri Pandit community
 A kind of woollen fabric used to make Pakol hats